Patrick M'Carthy was an Irish priest in the late Twelfth century: the first recorded Archdeacon of Cork.

References

Archdeacons of Cork